Odisha Adarsha Vidyalaya (OAV; literally Odisha Model School) is a chain of schools are being set up, one at each of 314 block headquarters of Odisha State, India.

List of 315 Odisha Adarsha Vidyalayas

History
Odisha Adarsha Vidyalaya Sangathan was established on September 19, 2015 as a society under The Society Registration Act of Odisha, by the Department of School and Mass Education, Govt. of Odisha.

The General Body is the apex body of the Sangathan headed by Minister, School & Mass Education as Chairman. Present Advisor and Working President is Upendra Tripathy appointed on 3 August 2021 after Dr Bijaya Kumar Sahoo succumbs To Covid-19 on 3 June 2021.  

These Adarsha Vidyalayas would be CBSE affiliated fully day boarding schools, provide free education, and target talented students through an annual entrance examination. They would have Class VI through Class XII and each class would have 80 students. These schools would be administered through Odisha Adarsha Vidyalaya Sangathan, a society registered under Society Registration Act of Odisha.

References

Education in Odisha
Schools in Odisha
2015 establishments in Odisha
Educational institutions established in 2015